A referendum on electoral reform was held in Botswana on 27 October 1987, the first time a referendum had been held in the country. The proposal involved the creation of the post of Supervisor of Elections, which would be appointed by the government. The referendum was passed with 78.1% of voters in favour.

Following the referendum, the next general elections, held in 1989, were boycotted by the Botswana National Front because the reforms did not provide for an independent electoral commission. The changes were reversed following another referendum in 1997.

Results

References

Botswana
1987 in Botswana
1987
Electoral reform in Botswana
Electoral reform referendums
1987